The 1957 All-Atlantic Coast Conference football team consists of American football players chosen by various selectors for their All-Atlantic Coast Conference ("ACC") teams for the 1957 NCAA University Division football season. Selectors in 1957 included the Associated Press (AP). The only unanimous choice on the AP team was halfback Dick Christy of North Carolina State.

All-Atlantic Coast selections

Ends
 Buddy Payne, North Carolina (AP-1)
 Ed Cooke, Maryland (AP-1)

Tackles
 Tom Topping, North Carolina (AP-1)
 Phil Blazer, North Carolina (AP-1)

Guards
 Roy Hord, Jr., Duke (AP-1)
 Rodney Breedlove, Maryland (AP-1)

Centers
 Jim Oddo, North Carolina State (AP-1)

Backs
 Dick Christy, North Carolina State (AP-1)
 Wray Carlton, Duke (AP-1)
 Jim Bakhtiar, Virginia (AP-1)
 Harvey White, Clemson (AP-1)

Key
AP = Associated Press, chosen by 78 voters of the Atlantic Coast Sports Writers Association

See also
1957 College Football All-America Team

References

All-Atlantic Coast Conference football team
All-Atlantic Coast Conference football teams